Tandi Wright (born 4 May 1966) is a New Zealand actress. She first gained recognition for portraying Nurse Caroline Buxton on the long running New Zealand soap opera Shortland Street.

She is best known for her roles as Fenn Partington on Seven Periods with Mr Gormsby and Catherine Duvall on Nothing Trivial.

She played a recurring role in 800 Words portraying the character Laura Turner.

Life
Wright was born in Zambia to New Zealander parents Vernon Wright and Dinah Priestley. She grew up in Wellington and attended Wellington High School and Victoria University of Wellington. She graduated from Toi Whakaari: New Zealand Drama School with a Diploma in Acting in 1994. Her father Vernon Wright, is a former journalist for "The Listener" who now lives in Zambia, and her mother Dinah is a writer and actress in Wellington. Wright has two sisters, Nicky (DOC policy advisor) and Justine (film editor), and two step sisters, Stephanie (information architect) and Victoria (teacher). Her husband Michael Beran is also an actor and they live in Auckland with their daughter, Olive.

Career
From 1995 to 2000, she appeared as Nurse Caroline Buxton in Shortland Street. Other roles include Power Rangers: S.P.D., Crash Palace, Out of the Blue, Seven Periods with Mr Gormsby, The Lost Children, Black Sheep and Legend of the Seeker.

In 2010, she played the role of Callie Ross, the wife of the main character, in This Is Not My Life. Her next major role followed in 2011–2014, as Dr Catherine Duvall on the TVNZ drama Nothing Trivial. She starred 2014 in the drama thriller series The Returned as Claire Winship.

Wright is vice president of the performers trade union Equity New Zealand.

Filmography

Television

Film

References

External links
 

1966 births
Living people
20th-century New Zealand actresses
21st-century New Zealand actresses
New Zealand film actresses
New Zealand soap opera actresses
New Zealand television actresses
People educated at Wellington High School, New Zealand
People from Wellington City
Toi Whakaari alumni